Creole Records was a UK record label that found most of its success in the disco and reggae genres in the mid-1970s to early 1980s.

Bruce White and Tony Cousins, who used the collective pseudonym Bruce Anthony, originally set up Commercial Entertainments in 1965 as a booking and management agency.  Desmond Dekker, Max Romeo, the Ethiopians and many other Jamaican groups and artists were handled by the agency who were joined by Dick Mills as a booker.
They first released records on the Creole label, established as a subsidiary of Trojan Records, in 1971, and started a new Creole label in 1975.

Creole released the debut singles of both Boney M. ("Baby Do You Wanna Bump") and Amanda Lear ("Trouble") in 1975. Other artists included Sugar Minott, Ruby Winters, Peter Green, Liquid Gold ("Dance Yourself Dizzy"), Maxine Singleton, Ken Gold, Danish reggae band Laid Back ("Sunshine Reggae") Chubby Checker, Sylvester, Frankie Vaughan, City 19 and Enigma who had a hit in 1981 with "Ain't No Stoppin' Us Now".

See also
 List of record labels

References

External links
 Creole record labels and sleeves

British record labels
Reggae record labels
Rock record labels
Pop record labels